Talovsky District  is an administrative and municipal district (raion), one of the thirty-two in Voronezh Oblast, Russia. It is located in the northeastern central part of the oblast. Its administrative center is the urban locality (a work settlement) of Talovaya. Population:  The population of Talovaya accounts for 31.7% of the district's total population.

The Russian Federal Nature Preserve Kamennaya Steppe is located in Talovsky District.

References

Notes

Sources

Districts of Voronezh Oblast